The AACTA Award for Best Direction in a Documentary, is a documentary award presented by the Australian Academy of Cinema and Television Arts (AACTA) to the director of an Australian documentary film or television series. Prior to the establishment of the academy in 2011, the award was presented by the Australian Film Institute (AFI) at the annual Australian Film Institute Awards (more commonly known as the AFI Awards) from 1998 to 2010. The award is presented at the AACTA Awards Luncheon, a black tie event which celebrates achievements in film production, television, documentaries and short films.

Winners and nominees
In the following table, winners are listed first, in boldface and highlighted in gold; those listed below the winner that are not in boldface or highlighted are the nominees.

AFI Awards (1998-2010)

AACTA Awards (2012-present)

See also
AACTA Awards

References

External links
The Australian Academy of Cinema and Television Arts Official website

Awards established in 1998
Documentary
Documentary film awards
1998 establishments in Australia